Sven Gunnar Persson (born 1955) is a Swedish Christian democratic politician, member of the Riksdag from 2002 to 2008.

References

Members of the Riksdag from the Christian Democrats (Sweden)
Living people
1955 births
Members of the Riksdag 2002–2006
Members of the Riksdag 2006–2010
21st-century Swedish politicians